Whitesand, or Whitesands or White Sand may refer to:

Places
 Whitesand Bay, a beach in Cornwall, England, UK
 Whitesands Bay (Pembrokeshire), a beach in Wales, UK
 Whitesands, village on the island of Tanna in Vanuatu

Canada
 Whitesand, Ontario, First Nations reserve in Thunder Bay District, Ontario
 Whitesand Lake (Hewitson River), in Thunder Bay District, Ontario
 Whitesand River (Hewitson River), Ontario
 Whitesand River (Lake Nipigon), Ontario
 North Whitesand Lake, in Thunder Bay District, Ontario
 Whitesand River (Saskatchewan), a river in Saskatchewan
 Whitesand Dam, a dam in Saskatchewan on the Reindeer River

Other uses
 Whitesand First Nation, an Ojibwe First Nation in northwestern Ontario, Canada
 Whitesands language, spoken on the eastern coast of Tanna Island in Vanuatu
 HMS Whitesand Bay (K633), Bay-class anti-aircraft frigate of the British Royal Navy
 White Sand (graphic novel), a fantasy graphic novel by Brandon Sanderson, Julius Gopez and Rik Hoskin
"White Sand", song by Boss Hog from Boss Hog (album)
"White Sand", song by Migos from Culture II
"White Sand", song by Armin van Buuren from A State of Trance 2006

See also
 White Sands (disambiguation)